The City of Masks is a lost 1920 silent film comedy drama produced by Famous Players-Lasky and distributed by Paramount Pictures. The film was directed by Thomas N. Heffron and starred stage star Robert Warwick.

Cast
Robert Warwick as Tommy Trotter
Lois Wilson as Miss Emsdale
Theodore Kosloff as Bosky
Edward Jobson as Corr McFadden
J. M. Dumont as Stuyvesant Smith
Robert Dunbar as Mr. Smith-Parvis
Helen Dunbar as Mrs. Smith-Parvis
Anne Schaefer as Mrs. Jacobs
Frances Raymond as Madam Deborah
William Boyd as Carpenter
George Berrell as Bramble
Snitz Edwards as Drouillard
Richard Cummings as Moody
T. E. Duncan as The Detective

References

External links

lantern slide ; coming attraction(Wayback Machine)

1920 films
American silent feature films
Lost American films
Films based on American novels
1920 comedy-drama films
1920s English-language films
American black-and-white films
Films directed by Thomas N. Heffron
1920 lost films
Lost comedy-drama films
1920s American films
Silent American comedy-drama films